Countess Anna of Stolberg-Wernigerode (6 September 1819 – 17 February 1868) was a German noblewoman.

Life
Anna was the eighth child of Count Anton of Stolberg-Wernigerode and his wife, Baroness Louise von der Recke. She was born in Peterswaldau in Silesia.  She had a sense of charity even as a child.

In 1834, the family moved to Düsseldorf. In 1834, her parents founded an infant school and in 1836, they founded the first Deaconess Association in the Rhenish-Westphalian area.  From 1837 to 1840, the family lived in Magdeburg; then they moved to Berlin.

In Berlin, Anna attended the newly founded deaconess hospital called  ("Bethany").  In 1854, she became a deaconess and deputy matron.  In 1855, she took over management as matron of the hospital.  She held this position until her death.  She died in 1868, at the age of 48.

References

 Arnold Wellmer: Anna, Gräfin zu Stolberg-Wernigerode, second edition, Bielefeld 1870
 

1819 births
1868 deaths
People from the Province of Silesia
19th-century German people
Anna Stolberg-Wernigerode
People from Dzierżoniów County